Borong is a Papuan language spoken in Morobe Province, Papua New Guinea. Dialects are Kosorong and Yangeborong.

References

External links 
 

Languages of Morobe Province
Huon languages